Richard Bevan Austin (January 23, 1901 – February 7, 1977) was a United States District Judge of the United States District Court for the Northern District of Illinois.

Education and career

Born in Chicago, Illinois, Austin received a Bachelor of Philosophy from Denison University in 1923 and a Juris Doctor from the University of Chicago Law School in 1926. He was in private practice in Chicago from 1926 to 1933, and again from 1948 to 1952, having served as an assistant state's attorney of Cook County, Illinois from 1933 to 1947, and as a first assistant state's attorney of Cook County from 1947 to 1948 and from 1952 to 1953. He was an acting state's attorney of Cook County from 1947 to 1948, and a special prosecutor from 1951 to 1952. He was a judge of the Superior Court of Cook County from 1953 to 1960. He was chief justice of the Criminal Court of Cook County from 1954 to 1955, running unsuccessfully as the Democratic nominee for Governor of Illinois in 1956, and again served as chief justice of the court from 1960 to 1961.

Federal judicial service

On August 7, 1961, Austin was nominated by President John F. Kennedy to a seat on the United States District Court for the Northern District of Illinois vacated by Judge Walter J. LaBuy. Austin was confirmed by the United States Senate on August 15, 1961, and received his commission the same day. He assumed senior status on October 10, 1975, serving in that capacity until his death on February 7, 1977, in Chicago.

References

Sources
 

1901 births
1977 deaths
Denison University alumni
University of Chicago Law School alumni
Judges of the United States District Court for the Northern District of Illinois
United States district court judges appointed by John F. Kennedy
20th-century American judges
Judges of the Superior Court of Cook County